The 1893 Georgetown Hoyas football team represented the Georgetown University during the 1893 college football season.  Georgetown finished the season with a 4–4 record.  Dick Harley served as player-coach.  They played home games at Boundary Park.

Schedule

References

Georgetown
Georgetown Hoyas football seasons
Georgetown football